XPN (X Python Newsreader) is a news client written in Python and based on the GTK+ library.

Features 
It offers a good MIME support, scoring system, filtered views, random tag-lines, external editor support, one-key navigation, ROT13, Face and X-Face headers decoding, spoiler char and many more. XPN is free software licensed under the GPL licence.

Thanks to Python and GTK+ it is completely multiplatform. It should work wherever Python and GTK work. A binary Windows version is also provided.

XPN is available in English, Italian, French and German.

ScreenShots

See also
List of Usenet newsreaders
Comparison of Usenet newsreaders

References

External links 
 
 

Free Usenet clients
Free software programmed in Python